The 2021–22 Kansas State Wildcats women's basketball team represented Kansas State University in the 2021–22 NCAA Division I women's basketball season. The Wildcats were led by eighth-year head coach Jeff Mittie. They played their home games at Bramlage Coliseum in Manhattan, Kansas and were members of the Big 12 Conference.

On January 23, 2022 against Oklahoma, junior Ayoka Lee set an NCAA women's basketball record of 61 points in a single game, breaking the previous record of 60 points.

Previous season

They finished the season 9–18, 3–15 in Big 12 play to finish in a tie for ninth place. As the tenth seed in the Big 12 Tournament, they defeated Texas Tech in the First Round before losing to West Virginia in the Quarterfinals. They were not invited to the NCAA tournament or the WNIT.

Roster

Schedule and results 

Source:

|-
!colspan=6 style=| Exhibition

|-
!colspan=6 style=| Non-conference regular season (10–2)

|-
!colspan=6 style=| Big 12 regular season (9–9)

|-
!colspan=6 style=| Big 12 Women's Tournament (0–1)

|-
!colspan=6 style=| NCAA tournament (1–1)

Rankings
2021–22 NCAA Division I women's basketball rankings

Coaches did not release a week 1 poll.

See also 
 2021–22 Kansas State Wildcats men's basketball team

References 

Kansas State Wildcats women's basketball seasons
Kansas State
2021 in sports in Kansas
2022 in sports in Kansas
Kansas State